Aida Karina Estrada Abril de Jaén (born 1986) is a Guatemalan beauty pageant winner.

Estrada was Miss Teen Guatemala in 2004, Miss Guatemala Universe in 2005 and International Coffee Queen in 2006 and was contestant in the Miss Universe, too, in 2006.

She married Juan Pablo Toledo in 2009.

And then and late she married Leonardo Jaén in 2013.

Sources
Girls from Guatemala entry
article on Estrada's marriage

1987 births
Guatemalan beauty pageant winners
Guatemalan female models
Living people
Miss Universe 2005 contestants